The 2017 Amateurs' Super Cup was the 3rd edition of the Greek Amateurs' Super Cup, an annual Greek football match played between the winner of the previous season's Gamma Ethniki Cup and the winner of the Amateur Cup. 

The match was contested by A.E. Karaiskakis, winners of the 2016–17 Gamma Ethniki Cup, and Irodotos, the 2016–17 Greek Amateurs' Cup winners. It was eventually won by Irodotos with a 0 − 1 victory. This was the fourth trophy in total won by the club for the 2016–17 season, as Irodotos had previously won the Heraklion FCA Championship and Heraklion FCA Cup double, along with the Greek Football Amateur Cup.

Details

References

2016–17 in Greek football